This is a list of rural localities under the jurisdiction of Moscow. Moscow (US chiefly) is the capital and most populous city of Russia, with 13.2 million residents within the city limits, 17 million within the urban area and 20 million within the metropolitan area. Moscow is one of Russia's federal cities, granting it a status of both an inhabited locality and a constituent federal subject.

Novomoskovsky Administrative Okrug 
Rural localities in Novomoskovsky Administrative Okrug:

 1st Rabochiy Poselok
 Kartmazovo, Moscow
 Vatutinki

Troitsky Administrative Okrug 
Rural localities in Dobrinsky District:

 Golokhvastovo
 Golokhvastovo
 LMS

See also 
 
 Lists of rural localities in Russia

References 

Moscow